The Football Cup of the Azerbaijan SSR was a playoff republican competition in association football which was held in the Azerbaijan SSR from 1936 to 1991.

Winners

1936: Stroitel Yuga Baku
1937: Temp Baku
1938: Temp Baku
1939: Lokomotiv Baku
1940: Dinamo Baku
1941–46: Not Played
1947: Pischevik Baku
1948: Pischevik Baku
1949: KKF Baku
1950: Trudovye Rezervy Baku
1951: Zavod im. S.M.Budennogo Baku
1952: Zavod im. S.M.Budennogo Baku
1953: Dinamo Baku
1954: BODO Baku
1955: Zavod im. S.M.Budennogo Baku
1956: NPU Ordgonikidzeneft Baku
1957: Mekhsul Tovuz
1958: SK BO PVO Baku
1959: Neftyannik Cuba
1960: ATZ Sumgait
1961: NPU Ordgonikidzeneft Baku
1962: MOIK Baku
1963: MOIK Baku
1964: Vostok Baku
1965: Vostok Baku
1966: Vostok Baku
1967: Apsheron Baku
1968: Politechnik Mingechaur
1969: MOIK Baku
1970: MOIK Baku
1971: Suruhanez Salyany
1972: Izolit Mingechaur
1973: MOIK Baku
1974: MOIK Baku
1975: Suruhanez Baku
1976: MOIK Baku
1977: Suruhanez Baku
1978: MOIK Baku
1979: Suruhanez Baku
1980: Energetik Ali-Bayramly
1981: Gandglik Baku
1982: Gandglik Baku
1983: FK Vilash Masalli
1984: Konditer Gandja
1985: Konditer Gandja
1986: İnşaatçı Sabirabad
1987: Khazar Lankaran
1988: Araz Baku
1989: Gandglik Baku
1990: Qarabağ
1991: İnşaatçı Baku

References

External links
 Bizim belə klublarımız olub: “Proqres”dən “İzolit”ə kimi

Azerbaijan SSR
Azerbaijan
Recurring sporting events established in 1936
1936 establishments in Azerbaijan
1991 disestablishments in Azerbaijan
Recurring events disestablished in 1991